Jakob Edvard Kuupik Kleist (born 31 March 1958) is a Greenlandic politician who served as the fourth prime minister of Greenland between 2009 and 2013. A member of the Inuit Ataqatigiit party, he was the first Prime Minister not affiliated with Siumut.

Early life and career
Kleist was born on 31 March 1958 to a Danish telegraphist and a Greenlandic mother in Qullissat, and was raised by his aunt and uncle. He attended primary school in Qullissat from 1966 until 1972 when the mining town was abandoned and then he attended lower secondary school in Sisimiut until 1975. When he was 17, he was sent to Denmark, alone and with no prior knowledge of Danish. He attended the Birkerød State School in Denmark from 1975 to 1978. Kleist graduated from Roskilde University in 1983 with a master's degree in social work (socionom). He taught journalism in Nuuk from 1988 to 1991.

Political career
In 1996, Kleist was appointed the Director of the Foreign Office of the Greenland Home Rule Government (Direktør for hjemmestyrets udenrigskontor). He was a Member of the Danish Parliament from 20 November 2001 to 13 November 2007, representing the Inuit Ataqatigiit (IA) party. IA will be the first party to govern the autonomous Danish territory under an expanded home rule agreement known as "self-rule" (selvstyre). While the self-rule agreement has been referred to a step towards eventual full independence from Denmark, Kleist's administration is expected to put "any push for independence [...] on the backburner", given his pledge to focus on social issues such as  alcoholism, domestic violence and a high suicide rate.

Kleist had risen to power on an agenda that included cleaning up following government scandals.

Prime Minister
Since 2007, he has been the leader of IA, a leftist political party which works towards Greenland's eventual full autonomy from Denmark. The party received the most votes in the 2009 election. In June 2009 the Greenlandic parliament therefore elected Kleist the fifth Prime Minister of Greenland. Kleist also had a very successful election himself and won 5,461 personal votes compared to just 1,413 votes for incumbent Prime Minister Hans Enoksen.

In late August 2009 Kleist met with Admiral Tim Sloth Jørgensen and General Walter Natynczyk, the chiefs of defense staff for Denmark and Canada, respectively. Admiral Jørgensen and General Natynczyk were conducting a tour of Danish and Canadian military bases in the Arctic.

See also
Greenlandic independence

Footnotes
References

Biography
 

1958 births
Living people
People from Qaasuitsup
Inuit Ataqatigiit politicians
Prime Ministers of Greenland
Government ministers of Greenland
Greenlandic socialists
Greenlandic Inuit people
Greenlandic people of Danish descent
Members of the Folketing 2001–2005
Members of the Folketing 2005–2007
21st-century Danish politicians
Greenlandic members of the Folketing